Lakhnadon Assembly constituency is one of the 230 Vidhan Sabha (Legislative Assembly) constituencies of Madhya Pradesh state in central India.

It is part of Seoni District.

Members of Legislative Assembly

As a constituency of Madhya Bharat

As a constituency of Madhya Pradesh

Election results

2013 results

See also
 Lakhnadon

References

Assembly constituencies of Madhya Pradesh